Cahaignes is a former commune in the Eure department in Normandy in northern France. On 1 January 2016, it was merged into the new commune of Vexin-sur-Epte.

Population

See also
 Communes of the Eure department
 Fourges, a close municipality in the same department

References
The abandoned Château

Former communes of Eure